Ahmadzai may refer to:

Ahmadzai (Wazir clan), a tribe found in Pakistan
Ahmadzai (Ghilji clan), a subgroup within the Suleiman Khel tribe found in Afghanistan

Pashtun tribes